Phakalane Power Station is a photovoltaic pilot power plant located in Phakalane, Botswana. The power station was funded through a Japanese grant which was part of Prime Minister Hatoyama's initiative strategy called Cool Earth Partnership aimed at supporting developing countries in their efforts to combat global warming. The Cool Earth Partnership is part of the initiatives which saw Hatoyama win the Sustainable Development Leadership Award in 2010.

See also 

 List of power stations in Botswana
 Tati Solar Power Station

References

Power stations in Botswana
Photovoltaic power stations in Botswana